Erik Takáč (born 26 February 1975) is a Slovak football forward who currently plays for Družstevník Veľký Horeš.

References

External links
 
 Eurofotbal profile
 Futbalnet profile

1975 births
Living people
Slovak footballers
Association football forwards
FK Slavoj Trebišov players
FC Senec players
ŠK Slovan Bratislava players
1. FC Tatran Prešov players
FC Lokomotíva Košice players
Slovak Super Liga players
Sportspeople from Trebišov